Eugenio Sbarbaro (born 3 July 1934) is an Italian prelate of the Catholic Church who spent his career in the diplomatic service of the Holy See.

Biography
Eugenio Sbarbaro was born on 3 July 1934 in Borzonasca, Province of Genoa. He was ordained a priest on June 11, 1960. He joined the diplomatic service in 1968 and his first assignments took him to Paraguay, Uganda, Turkey, and the United States.

On 14 September 1985, Pope John Paul II appointed him Titular Archbishop of Tiddi and   Apostolic Pro-Nuncio to Malawi and to Zambia. He received his episcopal consecration on 19 October from Cardinal Agostino Casaroli.

On 7 February 1991, John Paul appointed him Apostolic Pro-Nuncio to Antigua and Barbuda, the Bahamas, Barbados, Belize, Dominica, Jamaica, Grenada, Saint Vincent and the Grenadines, Saint Lucia, and Trinidad and Tobago, as well as Apostolic Delegate for the Antilles. In addition, he appointed him Nuncio to Suriname on 13 July 1994, to Guyana on 26 August 1997, and to Saint Kitts and Nevis on 23 October 1999.

On 26 April 2000, John Paul appointed him Apostolic Nuncio to Yugoslavia.

His title and responsibilities changed with the breakup of Yugoslavia. By February 2007 he was Nuncio to Serbia.

His diplomatic service ended when Benedict replaced him as Nuncio to Serbia on 8 August 2009.

He was later connected by news reports to Rev. Michael Seed's attempts to sell Vatican titles in exchange for contributions, with Sbarbaro providing an introduction to a Balkan arms dealer.

See also
 List of heads of the diplomatic missions of the Holy See

References

External links 
 Catholic Hierarchy: Archbishop Eugenio Sbarbaro 

1934 births
Living people
Apostolic Nuncios to Malawi
Apostolic Nuncios to Zambia
Apostolic Nuncios to Antigua and Barbuda
Apostolic Nuncios to the Bahamas
Apostolic Nuncios to Barbados
Apostolic Nuncios to Belize
Apostolic Nuncios to Dominica
Apostolic Nuncios to Jamaica
Apostolic Nuncios to Grenada
Apostolic Nuncios to Saint Vincent and the Grenadines
Apostolic Nuncios to Saint Lucia
Apostolic Nuncios to Suriname
Apostolic Nuncios to Guyana
Apostolic Nuncios to Saint Kitts and Nevis
Apostolic Nuncios to Trinidad and Tobago
Apostolic Nuncios to Yugoslavia
Apostolic Nuncios to Serbia
Clergy from the Province of Genoa